RMS Viceroy of India was an ocean liner of the Peninsular and Oriental Steam Navigation Company (P&O). She was a British Royal Mail Ship on the Tilbury–Bombay route and was named after the Viceroy of India. In World War II, she was converted to and used as a troopship.

Building
P&O ordered the ship from Alexander Stephen and Sons of Glasgow in 1927. She was originally to be called Taj Mahal, after the 17th-century mausoleum of Mumtaz Mahal in Agra. She was laid down in April 1927, launched in September 1928 and completed in March 1929. She cost £1,090,987

She had six water-tube boilers with a combined heating surface of  that supplied steam at 400 lbf/in2 to two turbo generators. These supplied current to electric motors with a combined rating of 3,565 NHP that drove twin screw propellers. British Thomson-Houston (BT-H) of Rugby, Warwickshire built the turbo-generators and motors.

Each turbo-generator ran at 2,690–3,110 RPM, producing three-phase current at 2,720 volts and rated at 900 kW. At reduced power of up to  only one turbo-generator was needed to supply current to both motors, thus maximising fuel economy.

The accommodation aboard was considered luxurious by the standards of the era. The first class state rooms were especially so, but standards were high in all classes on this ship. All cabins were single berth with interconnecting doors, with extra rooms for servants who often travelled with colonial families. Her onboard amenities also included   the then unusual luxury of an indoor swimming pool. Much of the interior decoration was designed by the Honourable Elsie Mackay, youngest daughter of James Mackay, 1st Earl of Inchcape, who was the chairman of P&O from 1914 until his death in 1932.

Viceroy of India carried cargo as well as passengers, and her holds were refrigerated for carrying perishables.

Launch and commissioning
The ship was launched as Viceroy of India on 15 September 1928 by Dorothy, Countess of Halifax, the wife of the Viceroy of India, E. F. L. Wood, 1st Earl of Halifax. The name had been changed to avoid offending Indians, particularly Muslims, for whom the Taj Mahal mausoleum is sacred.

Fitting out at Shieldhall Wharf, Glasgow, began on 8 January 1929. Viceroy of India was finished in P&O's traditional colours: her hull black with a white band, her boot topping red, her upper works and lifeboats buff, her large vents black, her small vents buff and her two funnels black.

During fitting out she was damaged amidships by Donaldson South American Line's  cargo ship , which was trying to dock in poor visibility. However, by 17 February Viceroy of India was ready for sea trials, on which she averaged . She was completed in March 1929.

P&O turbo-electric ships
Viceroy of India was Britain's first large turbo-electric passenger ship. At about the same time as she was built, P&O also had s performance increased by the addition of BT-H turbo generators and propulsion motors to supplement her quadruple-expansion engines.

Each "Strath" was only about  bigger than Viceroy of India but they produced about 77% more power, which made them about  faster than Viceroy of India.

Civilian service

Viceroy of India was handed over to P&O on 7 March 1929 and made her maiden voyage on the Indian mail route. Viceroy of India was also suited for leisure cruises, which she made every year until the outbreak of World War II in September 1939.

On 9 August 1929, she collided with the tug Olanda at Venice, Italy. Olanda was beached after the collision.
 
On 23 November 1929 Viceroy of India rescued 25 crew members from the Italian cargo steamship Maria Luisa, which sank in the eastern Mediterranean off the coast of Egypt.

In February 1930 Viceroy of India was berthed in Bombay when the  British India Line ship Warfield collided with her. The collision pushed the liner against a dockside crane, which she demolished. Viceroy of India herself escaped serious damage.

Later in 1930 Viceroy of India twice assisted the Greek cargo steamship Theodoros Bulgaris in the Bay of Biscay. In September she stood by when Theodoros Bulgaris cargo of grain shifted in storms and the Greek merchantman's crew were transferred to another vessel. On 31 December 1930 Theodoros Bulgararis sank, and Viceroy of India rescued all of the crew.

In September 1932, Viceroy of India set a new record time between London and Bombay of 17 days, 1 hour, 42 minutes.

On 5 September 1935 the Cunard White Star liner  and the Chargeurs Réunis cargo steamship Formigny collided off Cape Finisterre. Doric stayed afloat but her 736 passengers were transferred to other ships as a precaution; 241 of them were transferred to Viceroy of India.

In February 1939, Viceroy of India cruised to the South Atlantic, where she became the first P&O liner to visit the island of Tristan da Cunha.

On 11 August 1940 the Shaw, Savill & Albion liner  and Bank Line cargo liner  collided in the South Atlantic off Walvis Bay. Both ships stayed afloat, but Ceramics 279 passengers were transferred to Viceroy of India as a precaution.

War service and sinking

On 12 November 1940 the Ministry of War Transport requisitioned Viceroy of India to be a troopship. She returned to the River Clyde for the conversion.

In 1942 Viceroy of India sailed in Convoy KMF-1A carrying Allied troops from Britain to invade French North Africa in Operation Torch. Early on 11 November 1942 she was returning empty from Algiers bound for Gibraltar. Two hit the ship, killing four crew members. At 0531 hrs U-407 fired a stern-tube torpedo at her but missed. The   took Viceroy of India in tow but she sank stern first and Boadicea rescued all 432 surviving crew and 22 passengers.

Notes

References
 
 

 

1928 ships
Ships built on the River Clyde
Maritime incidents in 1929
Maritime incidents in November 1942
Ocean liners of the United Kingdom
Passenger ships of the United Kingdom
Ships of P&O (company)
Ships sunk by German submarines in World War II
Steamships of the United Kingdom
Troop ships of the United Kingdom
Turbo-electric steamships
World War II shipwrecks in the Mediterranean Sea